is a historic Japanese temple in Senko-ji Park in Onomichi, Hiroshima, Japan.

Overview
Senkō-ji was founded in the year 806, the 1st year of the Daidō era.

Senkō-ji is the 10th site of the Chūgoku 33 Kannon Pilgrimage.

From Senkō-ji, visitors can view the downtown of Onomichi and the Seto Inland Sea.

There is a  about 25 authors related to Onomichi, including Shiga Naoya and Fumiko Hayashi.

The temple was featured as major landmark in the video game, Yakuza 6: The Song of Life.

See also 
Senkōji Ropeway
Chūgoku 33 Kannon Pilgrimage
Shiga Naoya
Fumiko Hayashi
 For an explanation of terms concerning Japanese Buddhism, Japanese Buddhist art, and Japanese Buddhist temple architecture, see the Glossary of Japanese Buddhism.

External links 

Senko-ji (in Japanese)
Senko-ji (Onomichi city)(in Japanese)

 

Buddhist temples in Hiroshima Prefecture